Molino Canyon is a steep-sided, boulder-strewn canyon in the Santa Catalina Mountains northeast of Tucson, Arizona, next to the Molino Basin Campground. The canyon is located within the Coronado National Forest, and encompasses a wide variety of flora and fauna, ranging from lush pine forest in the canyon's upper reaches to Sonoran Desert cactus forest in the lower reaches. Catalina Highway was cut into the western side of the lower part of the canyon.

At the bottom of Molino Canyon is Molino Creek, a seasonal stream that flows southwest over large granite outcroppings, forming a series of small waterfalls and pools. Stream-flow is greatest in the spring, as the winter snow melts, and during the monsoon season. The banks of the creek are lined with willow, cottonwood and Arizona sycamore trees. The Molino Canyon Vista is located along Catalina Highway in the transition zone between Sonoran Desert cactus forest and oak-studded grassland, one mile south of the Molino Basin Campground, and provides foot access to Molino Creek.

See also

 Sabino Canyon
 List of rivers of Arizona

References

External links
  – 
  – 

Canyons and gorges of Arizona
Santa Catalina Mountains
Coronado National Forest
Rivers of Pima County, Arizona
Protected areas of Pima County, Arizona
Geography of Tucson, Arizona
Landmarks in Tucson, Arizona
Tourist attractions in Tucson, Arizona
Rivers of Arizona